Julio José Camba Chao (born 5 June 1996) is a Spanish footballer who plays for Viveiro CF as a central defender.

Club career
Born in Vilalba, Lugo, Camba was a youth product of CD Lugo. He made his official debut for the Galicians' first team on 9 November 2014, starting in a 2–1 home win against CE Sabadell FC in the Segunda División.

On 9 July 2015, Camba was loaned to Segunda División B club UD Somozas in a season-long move. After failing to make any appearances, he moved to Polvorín FC who acted as Lugo's farm team.

On 6 September 2017, Camba signed for Viveiro CF, still in the regional leagues.

References

External links

1996 births
Living people
People from Vilalba
Sportspeople from the Province of Lugo
Spanish footballers
Footballers from Galicia (Spain)
Association football defenders
Segunda División players
Tercera División players
CD Lugo players
UD Somozas players
Polvorín FC players